Mila in the Multiverse is a Brazilian science fiction television series for children and adolescents, produced by Nonstop and Boutique Filmes for The Walt Disney Company. In Brazil, the eight-part first season of the series was released on 25 January 2023 on Disney+.

Plot  
For her 16th birthday, Mila receives a very special present. Mila can now travel back and forth between different parallel universes to look for her mother, Elis. But Mila soon discovers that her mother's disappearance is just the beginning of the story and her journey. Since Elis found out that several universes actually exist in parallel, she has been hunted by a mysterious group called "Os Operadores". Mila has to adjust to this new and extremely dangerous situation and receives support from her friends Juliana, Vinícius and Pierre. Together with them Mila travels the huge multiverse in search of her mother Elis. An unbelievable adventure full of surprises and dangers awaits the friends.

Cast and characters 
 Laura Luz	as Mila
 Malu Mader as Elis
 Yuki Sugimoto	as Juliana
 Dani Flomin as Pierre		
 João Victor as Vinícius	
 Rafaela Mandelli as Diretora Verônica		
 Felipe Montanari as Bóris		
 Danilo de Moura as Domênico
 Amanda Lyra as Ilka
 Jader Januario as Felipe

Episodes

References

External links 
 

2020s Brazilian television series
Adventure television series
Comedy-drama television series
Disney+ original programming
Mystery television series
Portuguese-language television shows
Science fiction television series
Television shows filmed in Brazil